Sebastián José Cavero Nakahoro (born 20 June 2002) is a Peruvian footballer who plays as a forward for FBC Melgar.

Career statistics

Club

Notes

References

2002 births
Living people
Peruvian footballers
Peru youth international footballers
Association football forwards
Club Alianza Lima footballers
Footballers from Lima